This is a list of the ambassadors of the United States to the Marshall Islands. The Office of the U.S. Representative was opened at Majuro on October 21, 1986. It was upgraded to an embassy on September 6, 1989. Karen B. Stewart is the current United States Ambassador to the Marshall Islands. She was  nominated by President Barack Obama on November 5, 2015 was confirmed by the U.S. Senate on May 17, 2016. She succeeded Thomas Armbruster.

Ambassadors
Samuel B. Thomsen – Career FSO
State of Residency: California
Title: Representative
Appointment: Jun 15, 1987
Presentation of Credentials: Jul 11, 1987
Termination of Mission: Left post, Jul 11, 1990
William Bodde, Jr. – Career FSO
State of Residency: Maryland
Title: Ambassador Extraordinary and Plenipotentiary
Appointment: Jun 27, 1990
Presentation of Credentials: Aug 6, 1990
Termination of Mission: Left post, Jun 28, 1992
David C. Fields – Career FSO
State of Residency: California
Title: Ambassador Extraordinary and Plenipotentiary
Appointment: Jul 7, 1992
Presentation of Credentials: Aug 19, 1992
Termination of Mission: Left post, May 15, 1995
Joan M. Plaisted – Career FSO
State of Residency: California
Title: Ambassador Extraordinary and Plenipotentiary
Appointment: Dec 19, 1995
Presentation of Credentials: Feb 9, 1996
Termination of Mission: Left post Jul 28, 2000
Note: Also accredited to Kiribati; resident at Majuro.
Michael J. Senko – Career FSO
State of Residency: District of Columbia
Title: Ambassador Extraordinary and Plenipotentiary
Appointment: Dec 28, 2000
Presentation of Credentials: Jan 26, 2001
Termination of Mission: Left post Aug 2, 2003
Note: Also accredited to Kiribati; resident at Majuro.
Greta N. Morris – Career FSO
State of Residency: California
Title: Ambassador Extraordinary and Plenipotentiary
Appointment: Jul 1, 2003
Presentation of Credentials: Aug 26, 2003
Termination of Mission: Left post, Aug 2, 2006
Clyde Bishop – Career FSO
State of Residency: Delaware
Title: Ambassador Extraordinary and Plenipotentiary
Appointment: Jul 18, 2006
Presentation of Credentials: Dec 7, 2006
Termination of Mission: January 20, 2009
Martha Campbell – Career FSO
State of Residency: Michigan
Title: Ambassador Extraordinary and Plenipotentiary
Appointment: August 21, 2009
Presentation of Credentials: September 7, 2009
Termination of Mission: July 11, 2012
Thomas Hart Armbruster - Career FSO
State of Residency: New York
Title: Ambassador Extraordinary and Plenipotentiary
Appointment: August 2, 2012
Presentation of Credentials: Sep 6, 2012
Termination of Mission: May 25, 2016
Karen B. Stewart - Career FSO
State of Residency: Unknown
Title: Ambassador Extraordinary and Plenipotentiary
Appointment: June 6, 2016
Presentation of Credentials: July 25, 2016
Termination of Mission: January 27, 2020
Roxanne Cabral
Appointment: December 31, 2019
Presentation of Credentials: February 6, 2020
Termination of Mission: Incumbent

See also
Marshall Islands – United States relations
Foreign relations of the Marshall Islands
Ambassadors of the United States

References

United States Department of State: Background notes on the Marshall Islands

External links
 United States Department of State: Chiefs of Mission for the Marshall Islands
 United States Department of State: Marshall Islands
 United States Embassy in Majuro

Marshall Islands

United States